Boxuelu is a metro station of Zhengzhou Metro Line 1.

The surrounding area of this station is still under construction, so the current usage of this station is very few.

Station layout
The station has 2 floors underground. The B1 floor is for the station concourse and the B2 floor is for the platforms and tracks. The station has one island platform and two tracks for Line 1.

Exits

References

Stations of Zhengzhou Metro
Line 1, Zhengzhou Metro
Railway stations in China opened in 2013